Dum Diversas (english: Until different) is a papal bull issued on 18 June 1452 by Pope Nicholas V. It authorized Afonso V of Portugal to conquer Saracens and pagans and consign them to "perpetual servitude". Pope Calixtus III reiterated the bull in 1456 with Inter caetera (not to be confused with Alexander VI's bull of the same title), renewed by Pope Sixtus IV in 1481 and Pope Leo X in 1514 with Precelse denotionis (English: Especially the description). The concept of the consignment of exclusive spheres of influence to certain nation states was extended to the Americas in 1493 by Pope Alexander VI with Inter caetera.

Background

By the summer of 1452 Ottoman Sultan Mehmed II had completed the Rumelihisarı fortress on the western or European side of the Bosporus. Located several miles north of Constantinople, it commanded the narrowest part of the strait. Byzantine Emperor Constantine XI wrote to Pope Nicholas for help. Issued less than a year before the Fall of Constantinople in 1453, the bull may have been intended to begin another crusade against the Ottoman Empire.  It was not until Afonso V of Portugal responded to a papal call for aid against the Turks that Pope Nicholas V agreed to support the Portuguese claims regarding territory in Africa. Although some troops arrived from the mercantile city-states in the north of Italy, Pope Nicholas did not have the influence the Byzantines thought that he had over the Western kings and princes. France and England were both weakened by the Hundred Years' War, and Spain was still engaged in conflict with Islamic strongholds in Iberia. Any western contribution was not adequate to counterbalance Ottoman strength.

In mid-15th-century Portugal, the ideals of chivalric honour and crusading were seen as the path for ambition and success. During the reign of Afonso V, the Portuguese nobility enjoyed great influence and prestige, and for several decades, the House of Braganza was the wealthiest and most influential force in the kingdom. In 1415, the wisdom and the justice of an attack on Morocco had to be seriously weighed, but during the reign of Afonso V and for the century afterward, "such enterprises were accepted as self-justifying crusades for religion, chivalry, and honor".

The raids and attacks of the Reconquista created captives on both sides, who were either ransomed or sold as slaves. The Portuguese crown extended that to North Africa. After the attack on Ceuta, the king sought papal recognition of it as a crusade. Similarly, after the 1441 attack on Mauretania, the crown again sought after the fact, papal acknowledgement that it was part of a just conflict. Such a determination would then indicate that those captured could legitimately be sold as slaves.

Content
To confirm the Portuguese trade rights, King Afonso V appealed to Pope Nicholas V for support, seeking the moral authority of the Church for his monopoly. The bull of 1452 was addressed to Afonso V and conceded Portugal's right to attack, conquer and subjugate Saracens and pagans.

Wilhelm Grewe finds Dum Diversas essentially "geographically unlimited" in its application, perhaps the most important papal act relating to Portuguese colonisation. Although undefined, Richard Raiswell finds that it clearly refers to the recently discovered lands along the coast of West Africa. Portuguese ventures were intended to compete with the Muslim trans-Sahara caravans, which held a monopoly on West African gold and ivory.

Inter caetera of 1456
Pope Calixtus III reiterated the main points of Dum Diversas in his bull four years later, Inter Caetera. Once again the Pope was attempting to raise support for a campaign against the advance of the Turks. Nuncios had been dispatched to all the countries of Europe to beseech the princes to join once more in an effort to check the danger of a Turkish invasion. However, the princes of Europe were slow in responding to the call of the pope, largely due to their own national rivalries. On 29 June 1456, Callixtus ordered the church bells to be rung at noon (see noon bell) as a call to prayer for the welfare of those defending Belgrade. Forces led by Janos Hunyady, Captain-General of Hungary, met the Turks and defeated them at Belgrade on 22 July 1456.

On March 13, 1456, Callixtus issued the papal bull Inter caetera (not to be confused with Inter caetera of 1493). This bull reaffirmed the earlier bulls Dum Diversas and Romanus Pontifex, which recognized Portugal's rights to territories it had discovered along the West African coast, and the reduction of the infidels and non-Christians territories to perpetual vassals of the Christian monarch. 

King Afonso had requested that ecclesiastical jurisdiction over lands located in the vicinity of the southern shore of Guinea be vested with the Order of Christ, the successor organization to the Knights Templars in Portugal. (His uncle, Infante Henry, was the Grand Master.) The conquest of these lands "... which the said infante withdrew with mailed hands from the hand of the Saracen...", had been funded by the resources of the Order.

Some historians view these bulls together as extending the theological legacy of Pope Urban II's Crusades to justify European colonization and expansionism, accommodating "both the marketplace and the yearnings of the Christian soul." A combination of pragmatism, fear of the Turks, and lobbying by vested interests meant that the crusade was associated with discovery well into the sixteenth century. The proclamations' long-term implications were, of course, not realized at the time.

In 1537 pope Paul III condemned "unjust" enslavement of non-Christians in Sublimus Dei. In 1686 the Holy Office limited the bull by decreeing that Africans enslaved by unjust wars should be freed.

Dum Diversas, along with other bulls such as Romanus Pontifex (1455), Ineffabilis et summi (1497), Dudum pro parte (1516), and Aequum reputamus (1534) document the Portuguese ius patronatus. Pope Alexander VI, a native of Valencia, issued a series of bulls limiting Portuguese power in favor of that of Spain, most notably Dudum siquidem (1493).

See also
Catholic Church and the Age of Discovery
Sicut Dudum

Notes

References
 
 
 Housley, Norman. Religious Warfare in Europe 1400-1536, p. 187, Oxford University Press, 2002 
 Payne, Samuel G., A History of Spain and Portugal, Vol.1, Chapt. 10

1452 works
1452 in Portugal
Documents of Pope Nicholas V
Slave trade
15th-century papal bulls
Persecution of Pagans